Nokomis is an unincorporated town in Sarasota County and a census-designated place (CDP) along the Gulf Coast of Florida, United States, located south of Osprey and just north of Venice. The town has access to the coast through Nokomis Public Beach and Casey Key. The town's population was 3,167 at the 2010 census. It is part of the Bradenton–Sarasota–Venice Metropolitan Statistical Area.

History 
In 1917, Alfred F. Wrede established the first post office with the name of Nokomis southwest of the original Venice post office. The same year, orthopedic surgeon Dr. Fred Albee purchased 112 acres from the Sarasota-Venice Company. With Ellis W. Nash, Albee created the Nokomis subdivision by subdividing the property into 130 lots, with streets radiating from two inner avenue circles and the new asphalt highway, which eventually became U.S. 41. On U.S. 41, Albee and investors built the Pollyanna Inn, a 35-room hotel.

The Florida guide, compiled in the late 1930s and first published in 1939, listed Nokomis's population as 79 and described it as "a suburb of Venice, […] separated from that town by Shackett Creek…"

Geography

Nokomis includes approximately 2.5 miles of the Legacy Trail, including a water crossing at the Shakett Creek (Dona Bay) bridge.

Casey Key is a barrier island to the northwest of the CDP along the Gulf of Mexico, where there are luxurious beachfront houses lining the key. Casey Key is not part of any CDP.

Demographics

As of the census of 2000, there were 3,334 people, 1,544 households, and 955 families residing in the CDP. The racial makeup of the CDP was 97.69% White, 0.60% African American, 0.24% Native American, 0.30% Asian, 0.27% from other races, and 0.90% from two or more races. Hispanic or Latino of any race were 1.86% of the population.

There were 1,544 households, out of which 19.8% had children under the age of 18 living with them, 49.8% were married couples living together, 8.0% had a female householder with no husband present, and 38.1% were non-families. 30.2% of all households were made up of individuals, and 13.7% had someone living alone who was 65 years of age or older.  The average household size was 2.15 and the average family size was 2.64.

In the CDP, the population was spread out, with 17.1% under the age of 18, 5.3% from 18 to 24, 25.5% from 25 to 44, 28.3% from 45 to 64, and 23.8% who were 65 years of age or older. The median age was 46 years. For every 100 females, there were 100.6 males. For every 100 females age 18 and over, there were 97.4 males.

The median income for a household in the CDP was $34,699, and the median income for a family was $37,731. Males had a median income of $27,209 versus $21,563 for females. The per capita income for the CDP was $22,077. About 8.6% of families and 12.9% of the population were below the poverty line, including 13.4% of those under age 18 and 10.6% of those age 65 or over.

References

Census-designated places in Sarasota County, Florida
Beaches of Sarasota County, Florida
Sarasota metropolitan area
Census-designated places in Florida
Populated places on the Intracoastal Waterway in Florida
Beaches of Florida
1917 establishments in Florida
Populated places established in 1917